Stemwinder Provincial Park is a provincial park located just west of Hedly in British Columbia, Canada.

References

Provincial parks of British Columbia
Regional District of Okanagan-Similkameen
Protected areas established in 1956
1956 establishments in British Columbia